The Peace Bridge is a cycle and foot bridge across the River Foyle in Derry, Northern Ireland. It opened on 25 June 2011, connecting Ebrington Square with the rest of the city centre. It is the newest of three bridges in the city, the others being the Craigavon Bridge and the Foyle Bridge. The  bridge was designed by AECOM, who also designed the Sutong Yangtze River Bridge, and Wilkinson Eyre Architects, who also designed the Gateshead Millennium Bridge.

The bridge was opened to the public by EU Commissioner for Regional Policy, Johannes Hahn; accompanied by the First and deputy First Ministers, Peter Robinson and Martin McGuinness;  and the Irish Taoiseach Enda Kenny. It is intended to improve relations between the largely unionist Waterside on the east bank with the largely nationalist Cityside on the west bank, by improving access between these areas, as part of wider regeneration plans. The bridge also provides a crossing over the railway line approaching Waterside station. Its curved footpath, track and cycleway link the Guildhall, in the centre of the city, with Ebrington Square in the Waterside area, and St. Columb's Park.

Funding
The bridge was funded jointly by the Department for Social Development (NI), the Department of the Environment, Community and Local Government along with matching funding, totalling £14 million, from the SEUPB Peace III programme.

References

2011 establishments in Northern Ireland
Bridges in Northern Ireland
Bridges completed in 2011
Buildings and structures in Derry (city)
Tourist attractions in Derry (city)
Pedestrian bridges in Northern Ireland
Cable-stayed bridges in Ireland
Derry (city)
Cyclist bridges in the United Kingdom
21st-century architecture in Northern Ireland